The National Football League Coaches Association (NFLCA) is a group of coaches in the National Football League (NFL). As of December 2021, the only coach not in the association was Bill Belichick.

During the 2011 NFL Lockout, the NFLCA filed a brief in favor of the players.

Successful coaches often become as well or even better-known than the athletes they coach, and in recent years have come to command high salaries and have agents of their own to negotiate their contracts with the teams. Professional level coaches may have contracts for millions of dollars a year. Due to the extensive time on the road and long hours, coaching is a high stress job and when the money is good, many coaches retire in their early fifties or sixties. In 2011, the NFL's coaches topped the list of Forbes' highest-paid sports coaches, with Bill Belichick in the #1 spot for the second year in a row.  Another major element of NFL coaches' contracts, negotiated between individual coaches and NFL teams/owners, are provisions that authorize the employing NFL teams to withhold part of a coach's salary when league operations are suspended, such as lockouts or television contract negotiations.

See also
American Football Coaches Association
National Basketball Coaches Association

References

American football organizations
Coaching associations based in the United States
National Football League coaches